Neto may refer to:

General
Neto (deity), an Iberian god
Neto (suffix), a name suffix distinguishing a man from his grandfather (including a list of people with the name)
Neto 1, a human gene

Places
Agostinho Neto Airport, an airport in Cape Verde 
Agostinho Neto University, an Angolan university
Coelho Neto, Maranhão, a municipality in the state of Maranhão in the Northeast region of Brazil
Medeiros Neto, a municipality in the state of Bahia in the North-East region of Brazil
Neto (river), a river in Calabria, southern Italy

People

Music
Neto Furtado, known by the mononym Neto, part of duo Flavel & Neto
Jandira Sassingui Neto (born 1983), Angolan singer/songwriter
João Neto, Brazilian sertanejo singer, part of duo João Neto & Frederico
Jovino Santos-Neto (born 1954), Brazilian American jazz musician, educator and producer

Politics
Agostinho Neto (1922–1979), first President of Angola (1975–1979)
Agustino Neto, Kenyan politician, lawyer, and Member of Parliament
António Alberto Neto, Angolan politician
Pitra Neto (born 1958), Angolan politician, professor and lawyer
Raul Bragança Neto (born 1946), prime minister of São Tomé and Príncipe
Valdemar Costa Neto, Brazilian politician and congressman

Sports
Neto (footballer, born 1966) (José Ferreira Neto), Brazilian footballer and commentator
Neto (footballer, born 1985) (Hélio Hermito Zampier Neto), Brazilian footballer
Neto (footballer, born 1989) (Norberto Murara Neto), Brazilian footballer
Neto (footballer, born 2002) (Antônio Fialho de Carvalho Neto), Brazilian footballer
Neto Baiano (born 1982), real name Euvaldo José de Aguiar Neto, Brazilian footballer
Neto Guerino (born 1950), Brazilian former footballer
Adauto Neto (born 1980), Brazilian footballer
Álvaro de Miranda Neto (born 1973), or "Doda" Miranda, Olympic-class Brazilian show jumping rider
Anica Neto (born 1972), aka Nequita, Angolan Team handball player
Antônio Braga Neto (born 1987), Brazilian mixed martial artist and grappler
Apolônio Morais da Paixão Neto (born 1982), Brazilian footballer 
Darcy Dolce Neto (born 1981), Brazilian footballer
Dovenir Domingues Neto (born 1981), Brazilian futsal player
Edon Amaral Neto (born 1967), aka Edinho, Brazilian footballer
Emanuel Neto (born 1984), Angolan basketball player 
Franco Neto (born 1966), Brazilian beach volleyball player 
Jaime Sunye Neto (born 1957), Brazilian grandmaster of chess
João Neto (born 1981), Portuguese judoka
José Neto (basketball) (born 1971), Brazilian basketball coach
José Neto (footballer) (1935-1987), Portuguese footballer
José Rodrigues Neto (born 1949), Brazilian footballer
Leonidas Pereira Neto (born 1979), Brazilian footballer 
Luís Carlos Novo Neto (born 1988), Portuguese footballer
Osni Neto (born 1979), Brazilian footballer
Otacílio Mariano Neto, (born 1982), Brazilian footballer
Otacilio Jales da Silva Neto, (born 1984), Brazilian footballer
Pedro Neto (born 2000), Portuguese footballer
Raulzinho Neto (born 1992), Brazilian basketball player
Renato Neto (born 1991), Brazilian footballer
Rosemar Coelho Neto (born 1977), Brazilian track and field sprint athlete

Others
Agenor Mafra-Neto, American chemical ecology researcher and entrepreneur
Chiara Neto, Italian chemist
Coelho Neto (1864—1934), Brazilian writer and politician
Dânia Neto (born 1983), Portuguese actress
Ernesto Neto (born 1964), Brazilian visual artist
Henrique Neto (born 1936), Portuguese entrepreneur, industrialist and former member of the Portuguese Parliament
João Cabral de Melo Neto (1920–1999), Brazilian poet and diplomat
José Sebastião de Almeida Neto (1841–1920), Cardinal of the Roman Catholic Church and Patriarch of Lisbon
Mário Cravo Neto (1947—2009), Brazilian photographer, sculptor and draughtsman
Torquato Neto (1944–1972), Brazilian journalist, poet and songwriter

See also
 
Netto (disambiguation)

Portuguese-language surnames